In 2018, NASCAR sanctioned three national series and six regional touring series.

National series
 2018 Monster Energy NASCAR Cup Series – The top racing series in NASCAR
 2018 NASCAR Xfinity Series – The second-highest racing series in NASCAR
 2018 NASCAR Camping World Truck Series – The third-highest racing series in NASCAR

Touring series
 2018 NASCAR K&N Pro Series West – One of the two K&N Pro Series
 2018 NASCAR K&N Pro Series East – One of the two K&N Pro Series
 2018 NASCAR Whelen Modified Tour – The modified tour of NASCAR
 2018 NASCAR Pinty's Series – The top NASCAR racing series in Canada
 2018 NASCAR PEAK Mexico Series – The top NASCAR racing series in Mexico
 2018 NASCAR Whelen Euro Series – The top NASCAR racing series in Europe

 
NASCAR seasons
2018 sport-related lists